Headless is an Italian hard rock band, founded in 1996 in Avezzano by Walter Cianciusi. Their music is characterized by the fusion of AOR and progressive metal. After having released an E.P. and a full-length album in 2000 the band suspended any recording or live activity. The turn of the events arrives in 2011 with a new line-up including Göran Edman (former Yngwie Malmsteen band) and Scott Rockenfield (Queensrÿche). 
After releasing the Growing Apart album in 2013 Headless toured Europe extensively opening for big acts like Fates Warning, Skid Row, Queensrÿche and Candlemass.
The successful tour ensured a contract with the Danish label Mighty Music. A new album entitled Melt The Ice Away arrived in 2016, followed by a European tour with Angra, Bonfire and Tygers of Pan Tang.
In 2020 the band announced a new line-up including Martin Helmantel of Elegy (band) on bass. The new studio effort Square One is out now via M-Theory Audio.

Discography

Albums

 Future To Past – (1996) (E.P.)
 Inside You – (1998)
 Growing Apart – (2013)
 Melt The Ice Away – (2016)
 Square One – (2021)

Singles

 Primetime – (2011)
 Sink Deep in a Fairytale – (2012)
 Shortage – (2015)
 So Much of a Bore – (2015)
 Good Luck Resized – (2016)
 Risin' Up – (2020)
 Woman In White – (2021)
 Streetlight Buzz – (2021)
 Two's Up – (2021)
 Misdirection – (2021)
 Withered Flowers feat. Jeff Young – (2023)

Band members

Current members
Göran Edman – vocals
Walter Cianciusi – guitars
Dario Parente – guitars
Martin Helmantel – bass guitar
Enrico Cianciusi – drums

Former members
Scott Rockenfield – drums (2011–2014)
Domenico Di Girolamo – bass (2014–2020)
Italo Podda – guitars (1996–1997)
Mauro Buoninfante – keyboards (1996–2000)
Naigel Carusi – bass (1996–2000)

References

External links 
  of Headless 
 M-Theory Audio

Italian progressive metal musical groups
Musical groups established in 1996